Yi Bok-nam (June 28, 1555 – August 16, 1597) was a Korean naval commander and politician of the Joseon Dynasty. He passed the military examination and attained the position of Byeongmajeoldosa (병마절도사, 兵馬節度使) for Jeolla Province. He served against the Japanese navy during the Imjin war. His courtesy name was Subo (수보, 綏甫).

Life 
In 1588, Yi passed the military examination (무과; 武科).

He is famed for his victories at the Battle of Woongchi and Ahndeokwon in 1592. He was killed on April 18, 1597 at the Siege of Namwon, aged 43.

The royal court eventually bestowed various honors upon him, including a posthumous title of Chungjanggong (충장공, 忠壯公, Loyal Duke of brave), an enrollment as a Seonmu Wonjong Gongsin (선무원종공신, 宣武原從功臣), and two posthumous offices, Jwachanseong (좌찬성, 左讚成, Left Vice Prime Minister).

See also 
 Imjin war
 Yi Sun-sin
 Yi Gwang-sik

External links 
 Yi Boknam:Naver 
 Yi Boknam:Korean historical informationm parson  
 Yi Bok-nam:Nate 

1555 births
1597 deaths
Korean admirals
Korean generals
Military history of Korea
16th-century Korean people
Korean military personnel killed in action
People of the Japanese invasions of Korea (1592–1598)
People from Gangneung